The Ministry of Energy of the Republic of Lithuania is a government department of the Republic of Lithuania. Its operations are authorized by the Constitution of the Republic of Lithuania, decrees  issued by the President and Prime Minister, and laws passed by the Seimas (Parliament). Its mission is to prosecute Lithuanian government policy in fuel, electricity, thermo-energy production and supply for Lithuania's economy. The current head of the Ministry is Dainius Kreivys.

Ministers

References

 
Energy
Lithuania